Cady Nunatak is a nunatak  east of Mount Zeigler in the northeast part of the Allegheny Mountains, in the Ford Ranges of Marie Byrd Land. The nunatak was mapped by the United States Geological Survey from surveys and from U.S. Navy air photos, 1959–65, and named by the Advisory Committee on Antarctic Names for Frederick M. Cady, a United States Antarctic Research Program ionospheric physicist at Byrd Station, in 1968.

References 

Nunataks of Marie Byrd Land
Ford Ranges